What Horrors Await is the sixth studio album by American death metal band Jungle Rot, released through Napalm Records on May 19, 2009. The album was re-released in April 2018 through the band's current label Victory Records, reissued with the original cover artwork and the original album remixed and remastered.

Track listing

Personnel 
David Matrise: Guitar/Lead Vocal
James Genenz: Bass Guitar/Backing Vocal
Geoff Bub: Lead Guitar
Eric House: Drums
Chris "Wisco" Djuricic: Producer
Gyula Havancsak: Art and Design

2009 albums
Jungle Rot albums
Napalm Records albums